Beijing National Day School (BNDS) ( or ) is a Chinese junior high and high school. Established in 1952, Beijing National Day School is one of the most prestigious high schools in China. It is located in Yuquanlu, Haidian District, Beijing, China. A long time beacon high school, BNDS distinguishes itself as a leading institution in both student activities and academic performance. BNDS frequently appears in the news and is often proclaimed to be a role model of next generation high school education in China. The school used to be affiliated with the People's Liberation Army of the People's Republic of China. It was established dedicating to the education for the children of senior level PLA officers, before being opened to public in 1964 and became a common high school ever since. Today BNDS is no longer affiliated to the PLA.

Every year, about 60 graduates, making about 20 percent of the graduating class, are admitted to Peking University and Tsinghua University, the two most prestigious universities in China. BNDS constantly stays within the top 3 in terms of college admission results in Beijing, which is also home to many of China's top high schools. BNDS provides international education offered in English through its International Baccalaureate, A-Level, and Advanced Placement programs through an affiliation with Wasatch Academy of Mt. Pleasant, Utah in the United States. Around one third of graduates each year choose to pursue their college educations abroad. A 2016 survey presented BNDS as one of the top Chinese high schools sending its graduates to elite universities overseas, in particular the United States and the UK. The school has produced many successful alumni over the years, many of which have had successful careers in their respective fields.

History 
The precursor of National Day School was a special elementary school named "October First Elementary School of Central Military Commission". The elementary school was established in September 1952 by the Central Military Commission of the People's Republic of China, and sanctioned by Marshal Nie Rongzhen, Zhu De and Prime Minister Zhou Enlai. The school was set up for educating the children of martyrs, officers who fought in the Korean War, and high-level officers of the PLA.

October First Secondary was established in 1952 under PLA management. The first principal of the school was Lin Yueqin (Marshal Luo Ronghuan's spouse); the vice-principal was Yu Shen (Lieutenant General Xiao Xiangrong's spouse). The school was exclusively for high level PLA officers' children, from establishment until 1964. Most of the graduates from October First School in that period joined the PLA.

Nie Rongzhen, Marshal of the PRC, named the school. "October First" is the national day of the PRC. October First Secondary School (Chinese:北京十一学校) and the Beijing No.11 Middle School are two different schools, although the two schools' Chinese names are similar.

School buildings 
In the early years, most buildings were one or two floors. A popular spot in the early years of the school was the Pentagon Garden. During the period from 1952 to 1992, that area included the main buildings in the school.

A rebuilding project started in the middle of the 1990s. The school administrator planned to enlarge the campus. In the late 1990s, the Junior High School Building, school library, and Senior High School buildings were constructed. In 2002, the sport field and laboratory building were closed for reconstruction, but the laboratory was reopened due to a classroom shortage; the space was required for classrooms. The old laboratory building was eventually removed in 2006.

From 2006 to late 2007, some new buildings such as an underground bookstore, International students building, arts building and athletic building, were completed.  These were all part of the second phase of the enlargement project. The school's main entrance was changed from the north gate to the western gate.

In 2013, the school became an International Baccalaureate school.

List of principals 
 Lin Yueqin (1952–1986)
 Li Jinchu (1987–2007)
 Li Xigui (2008–present)
 Tian Jun (2019–present)

Student societies and activities 
The student's leagues of October First school are classified as school-level leagues and non-School-level leagues. Financing for school-level leagues is provided from the school budget. Fees for non-school level leagues are paid by the student. Leagues recruit new members at the start of each term, and anyone who wants to set up a new league must apply to the school administrator office in that period.

Every April and November there are two periods for league activities and exhibits. Sometimes, the school administration may upgrade some of the better activities, and bestow the award "Elite League".

All leagues are nominally managed by the Student Union and Communistic Youth League Committee of October First School. However, the Student Union and CYLC have no jurisdictional powers.

The permanent student activities of school are Moot, flea market and student gymkhana. These three are school level activities, which means they are supported by the school administrator. In addition, there are some other activities, such Christmas parties, New Year parties in classes and dormitories, and a mid-autumn party which are held independently by the students.

The school has numerous of leagues. Some of the School-Level Leagues are:

 BNDS Dragons Football Team (American football club)
 The Student Union of Beijing National Day School
 H.C.C. (Hotspot Computer Club)
 Student Television Station
 Educational Minister Assistant Party (EMAP)
 The Assistant Council of School Moral Education Administrator
 The Research Society of School History
 School Gymnastic Team
 Kalaer Comic Club
 Volunteers' Association
 Golden Sail Orchestra
 The Chorus of Child's Voice
 Psychology Association
 Bai Hua Painting and Calligraphy Association
 Olive Branch League
 The Hunters
 Photography Enthusiast Association
 Minor Atomy—— youngster Voluntary Service Association
 Beijing National Day School Model United Nations Association (SYMUN)
 Byzantine Dance Club

References

External links 
 The website of Stundent Union of October First School
 
 The website of HCC Computer Community, a computer club in the school
 Shi Yi Quan, online space for students of National Day School

Schools in Haidian District
High schools in Beijing
Educational institutions established in 1952
1952 establishments in China